is a railway station on the Ban'etsu East Line in the city of Iwaki, Fukushima Prefecture, Japan operated by East Japan Railway Company (JR East).

Lines

Station layout
The station has a single island platform connected to the station building by a level crossing. The station is unattended.

Platforms

History
Kawamae Station opened on October 10, 1917. The station was absorbed into the JR East network upon the privatization of the Japanese National Railways (JNR) on April 1, 1987.

Surrounding area
Natsui River
Kawamae Post Office

See also
 List of Railway Stations in Japan

References

External links

   

Stations of East Japan Railway Company
Railway stations in Fukushima Prefecture
Ban'etsu East Line
Railway stations in Japan opened in 1917
Iwaki, Fukushima